The Canadian Forces Housing Agency is a special operating agency that manages military housing on behalf of the Canadian Department of National Defence  for members of the Canadian Armed Forces and their families located on wings and bases.

Established in October 1995, it operates and maintains 11,665 military family housing units across Canada. The organization is headed by a chief executive officer.

Housing units 
The housing units are located in:

3 Wing Bagotville
 CFB Borden
 4 Wing Cold Lake
 19 Wing Comox
 17 Wing Det Dundurn
 Edmonton Garrison
 CFB Esquimalt
 CFB Gagetown
 CFB Gander 	
 5 Wing Goose Bay
 14 Wing Greenwood
 CFB Halifax
JTFN Det NU Iqaluit
 CFB Kingston
CFS Det Masset
CFB Montreal
 CFB Moose Jaw
 CFB North Bay
CFSU
 4 CDSB Petawawa
 CFB Shilo
 CFB Suffield
8 Wing Trenton
 CFB Valcartier
CFB Wainwright
 CFB Winnipeg
JTFN HQ Yellowknife

References

1995 establishments in Canada
Housing Agency
Government agencies established in 1995

Forces_Housing_Agency, Canadian